St. Andrew's Village (abbreviation: SAV) is a 13.5 ha school complex located in the Central Region of Singapore. It was officially opened on 26 August 2006, with the ceremony being held at the 1000-seater Cultural Centre in the Junior College.

The Village consists of Woodsville Campus and Potong Pasir Campus, located on the east and west bank of the Kallang River respectively. Both campuses are linked to each other by the Jacob Ballas Bridge, forming the Village. It mainly houses the three schools of St. Andrew's School — SAJS, SASS and SAJC. In addition to these three schools, the Village also houses the (Anglican) Diocesan Office, the Ascension Kindergarten, three church buildings and a hostel.

St. Andrew's Village is in close proximity to Potong Pasir MRT station, making it easily accessible by public transport. It is also well connected to other parts of Singapore, as it is bounded by the Central Expressway on its west and the Pan Island Expressway (PIE) on its south.

Woodsville Campus
Woodsville Campus is located along Francis Thomas Drive, which named after the late Mr. Francis Thomas, on the east bank of Kallang River. It comprises St. Andrew's Junior School (SAJS), St. Andrew's Secondary School (SASS), Ascension Kindergarten, Church of the Resurrection, Church of the Ascension, and the Diocese of Singapore.

Sport facilities can also be found in this campus, mainly to serve the student population. These include a rugby field and an Olympic-sized swimming pool. An indoor sports hall is currently under construction in this campus.

Potong Pasir Campus
Potong Pasir Campus is located along Sorby Adams Drive, which was named after the late Reverend Reginald Keith Sorby Adams, on the west bank of Kallang River. It comprises St. Andrew's Junior College (SAJC) and the Chapel of the Holy Spirit. The 1000-seater two-storey Cultural Centre is also located in this campus. Sports facilities in this campus include a 400m synthetic track, a synthetic rugby/football field, and rooftop tennis courts.

The 12-storey St. Andrew's Hall (SA Hall) is also located in Potong Pasir Campus. It is a co-educational residence (hostel) housing up to 600 students, and was officially opened on 25 August 2012. The Hall is under the management of the Board of Governors of St Andrew’s Junior College (SAJC) and is also a member of the Anglican Diocese of Singapore.

References

Schools in Central Region, Singapore